William Price was a male United States international table tennis player. 

He won a bronze medal at the 1948 World Table Tennis Championships in the men's team event.

He was inducted into the USA Table Tennis Hall of Fame in 1980.

See also
 List of table tennis players
 List of World Table Tennis Championships medalists

References

American male table tennis players
1915 births
Year of death missing
World Table Tennis Championships medalists
20th-century American people